Amanda Leveille (born June 10, 1994) is a Canadian professional ice hockey goaltender for the Minnesota Whitecaps of the Premier Hockey Federation (PHF). She currently holds the PHF record for all-time wins, and has won the Isobel Cup twice.

Career

Early career 

As a youth player, Leveille played on AAA boys teams, being named best goaltender at the 2011 Canadian National U18 Championship. In 2011, she joined the Ottawa Lady Senators, where she would stay for her last two years of high school.

University 

During college, Leveille played for the Minnesota Golden Gophers women's ice hockey program for four seasons between 2012 and 2016. She posted three shutouts in her first three starts, not giving up a single goal in the 7 games she played in her first season serving as backup to Noora Räty.

After Räty graduated, Leveille would take over the starting job. The team would win the national championship three times by the time she graduated, as she finished fifth in NCAA history for wins and sixth for shutouts.

Premier Hockey Federation 

Leveille was drafted 12th overall in the 2015 NWHL draft by the Buffalo Beauts. On 28 April 2016, Leveille signed a one-year, $15,000 contract with the Beauts for the 2016–17 season. She was the first draft pick to sign a contract in league history.

Leveille won the 2017 Isobel Cup with the Buffalo Beauts. Leveille was one of the team captains at the 3rd NWHL All-Star Game during the 2017–18 season. By season's end, she was recognized as the 2018 NWHL Goaltender of the Year.

On 18 June 2018, Leveille signed with the Minnesota Whitecaps for their first season in the PHF. She was the first player to sign with the new franchise. In her first year with the Whitecaps, Leveille won the Isobel Cup for the second time.

In the 2019-20 season, Leveille would again be named to the NWHL All-Star Game, and finished as runner-up for Goaltender for Year. She finished the season with the most minutes played and the most saves made of any goalie. The Whitecaps would make the Isobel Cup finals, marking the 4th year in a row that she has played in the finals.

International 

Leveille has participated in Team Canada's U22 development team, but has yet to play for the senior team.

Personal life 

Leveille has been noted for her humorous hockey-themed social media presence. She has named former NHL goaltender Martin Brodeur and Canadian Olympian Shannon Szabados as role models.

She attended Frontenac Secondary School, where she was an honour student, volunteering at the Royal Ottawa Hospital. She has a degree in recreation park and leisure studies.

Career statistics

Awards and honours
 NWHL Co-Player of the Week, Awarded January 29, 2018
 2018 Goaltender of the Year
 NWHL Fans’ Three Stars of the Season, 2020
 NWHL All-Star Game, 2018, 2019, 2020
 2021 Goaltender of the Year
 2021 Foundation Award (Minnesota Whitecaps representative)

References

External links
 

1994 births
Buffalo Beauts players
Canadian women's ice hockey goaltenders
Ice hockey people from Quebec
Isobel Cup champions
Living people
People from Brossard
Minnesota Whitecaps players
Premier Hockey Federation players
Minnesota Golden Gophers women's ice hockey players